Leonard Anthony Harris (born October 28, 1964) is a former Major League Baseball utility infielder. Listed at 5' 10", 195 lb., Harris  batted left-handed and threw right-handed. He is best known for holding the record for the most pinch hits in a Major League career, with 212.

Professional career

Harris was the Cincinnati Reds' fifth-round pick in the 1983 amateur draft. He batted .372 in 16 games with Cincinnati in 1988.

Harris continued playing with the Dodgers through the  season, playing in at least 107 games each season. 1993 was also the year when he started doing more pinch hitting.

Harris pitched once for the Reds, on June 1, 1998. It was the first time a Reds position player had been used as a pitcher in ten years.

In 1998, he batted .295 with the Reds in 57 games, but after joining the Mets, he batted only .232 and did not re-sign with the Mets the following year, instead opting to sign with the Colorado Rockies. He hit well with Colorado, but was traded to the Arizona Diamondbacks for minor leaguer Belvani Martinez after 91 games there. He went 11-for-29 in 19 games with the Diamondbacks; he remained in Arizona for the first two months of the  season, when he was traded back to the Mets for pitcher Bill Pulsipher. He finished the 2000 season with the Mets and also spent the  season there. In 2001, he broke MLB's career pinch hits record, previously held by Manny Mota (150). Note, the 150-mark has also been surpassed by Mark Sweeney (175).

The  season proved successful for Harris. He batted .305 in 122 games with the Milwaukee Brewers at the age of 37, showing that he would still be able to play for several more years. He started the  season with the Chicago Cubs, with whom he played 75 games before being released and signing with the Florida Marlins. He was on the Marlins' championship team in the 2003 World Series. However, the Marlins released him during spring training in 2006.

Coaching career
After his release, he became the infield coordinator for the Washington Nationals, and eventually, the hitting coach. He was fired by the Nationals on September 28, after less than two seasons on the job.

On October 24, 2008, Harris became the Los Angeles Dodgers minor league hitting instructor at Camelback Ranch, the team's Spring Training facility. In 2011, he was the hitting coach for the Great Lakes Loons. After serving as a coach for the Gulf Coast League Marlins, he became the assistant hitting coach of the Miami Marlins and later became the third base coach of the Miami Marlins. He was let go by the Marlins after the 2016 season.
For the 2017 season, Harris returned to the Reds as a coach for their Arizona league affiliate.

References

External links

Retrosheet

1964 births
Living people
African-American baseball coaches
African-American baseball players
Albuquerque Isotopes players
Arizona Diamondbacks players
Baseball players from Miami
Billings Mustangs players
Cedar Rapids Reds players
Chicago Cubs players
Cincinnati Reds players
Colorado Rockies players
Florida Marlins players
Glens Falls Tigers players
Leones del Caracas players
American expatriate baseball players in Venezuela
Los Angeles Dodgers players
Major League Baseball hitting coaches
Major League Baseball second basemen
Major League Baseball third basemen
Milwaukee Brewers players
Nashville Sounds players
New York Mets players
Sports coaches from Miami
Tampa Tarpons (1957–1987) players
Vermont Reds players
Washington Nationals coaches
21st-century African-American people
20th-century African-American sportspeople